The Second Battle of Ras al-Ayn was part of the 2019 Turkish offensive into north-eastern Syria, during the Rojava conflict of the Syrian Civil War. The battle was fought between Turkish Armed Forces and the Turkish-backed Syrian National Army (SNA) against the Syrian Democratic Forces (SDF). The battle resulted in the capture of Ras al-Ayn/Serê Kaniyê  by Turkish/SNA forces on 20 October, and the incorporation of the town under the Turkish occupation of northern Syria.

Background 
The battle began with the start of 2019 Turkish offensive into north-eastern Syria on 9 October 2019. Turkish forces targeted two border towns, Ras al-ayn and Tell Abyad, 120 kilometres to its west.

Battle

Initial movements

Turkish and TFSA forward troops crossed into Syria, moving close to Ras Al-Ayn on 9 October. The town was initially targeted by artillery and aerial bombing by the Turkish Air Force, which resulted in some of the civilian population fleeing the area, heading south. Reinforced Turkish units proceeded to move towards the town later in the day.

Turkish forces move into Ras al-Ayn
On 12 October, more substantive Turkish forces attacked the town, moving into it, with some reports that Turkish forces had moved into the center of the town. At the same time, the SDF did a tactical retreat, pulling back before the Turkish forces in response to a Turkish artillery bombardment of their position. Clashes continued in the Industrial district. Turkish troops continued to move into the town, gaining control of the Ras al-Ayn's residential center, with some Turkish media sources stating that the town had been completely captured. However, SDF troops showed video of themselves still in the town, continuing to engage the Turkish forces. On 13 October Kurdish politician and secretary general of the Future Syria Party, Hevrin Khalaf and a number of unarmed civilians were executed outside the town, caught on a road, by the TFSA. A convoy of SDF supporters, with International Media, was attacked near Ras al-Ayn, It had been attempting to go to the city to show support. The Syrian Observatory for Human Rights said Turkish airforce had attacked the column, killing 14 people and wounding 10.

SDF counteroffensive

On 13 October, SDF launched a counteroffensive, pushing back Turkish military and recapturing key points of the town, including the industrial district. By 15 October, the SDF had fully recaptured the town, according to SOHR, and repelled attacks from four groups of TFSA.  SDF had prepared extensive tunnels under Ras al-Ayn, and used them to launch attacks on Turkish and TFSA units in the town.

Ras al-Ayn siege and ceasefire

On 17 October Turkish and SNA forces completely besieged and captured half of Ras al-Ayn, gaining ground in the offensive, after getting around the town and cutting off the roads leading to it amid heavy clashes according to SOHR.

Later in the day, the US government and Turkey agreed on a five-day ceasefire deal, to allow the SDF to withdraw from the 20 mile safe-zone on the Turkish border. SDF said they only accepted the ceasefire in the area between Tall Abyad and Ras al-Ayn, the SDF rejected withdrawing from the entire 20 mile area and handing it over to Turkey as calling it an occupation. Clashes continued in the town despite the ceasefire, both sides said the other side was violating the ceasefire. Red Crescent ambulances reported they could not reach the town to evacuate the wounded SDF fighters on the first day of the ceasefire. Turkey and the SDF blamed each other for the ceasefire violations, with the SDF stating that the town was surrounded during the ceasefire and wounded could not be evacuated. 
On the 17th of October, an airstrike from Turkish airforce wounded some residents of the city, with reports that white phosphorus had been used against civilians. Syrian medics treating 5 wounded civilians that were evacuated to Hasakah, showed the media burns on the victims they said were consistent with the use of white phosphorus. Turkey said the reports were false.

On the 18th of October, a large convoy of 80 cars and 400 civilians, including the Free Burma Rangers, and people who had traveled from Derik, Qamishlo, Til Temir and Heseke, attempted to get to Ras al Ayn to provide humanitarian aid. It was blocked from entry by TFSA soldiers, according to  the SDF. In the afternoon the SDF said an aid convoy had been let through, after having been prevented from entering the town since Thursday.

Syrian Arab Army units for the first time confronted the Turkish and TFSA units near Ras Al-Rayn, with reports by the media that they could join the combat on the SDF side and lift the siege of the city by the TFSA.

On 20 October, the Heyva Sor (Kurdish Red crescent) were allowed into the town, and evacuated 30 injured people, both civilians and soldiers. The medical team stated that the town was running low on supplies. The hospital itself had come under attack in a TFSA attempt to capture it. International fighters with the SDF saw combat, and at least one German citizen died in the battle, defending the hospital.

SDF withdrawal as part of US-brokered deal
On the third day after the town was fully encircled, the SDF on the 20th of October announced they would be withdrawing from Ras Al Ayn, to comply with the US brokered deal with Turkey. Some SDF forces started withdrawing, accompanied by some of the civilian residents, who also left afraid of the Turkish allied militias. The SDF commander who announced the deal, said the SDF would withdraw back to the 30 km area imposed by the ceasefire conditions, only after the civilians and soldiers were allowed to evacuate from Ras al-ayn. Despite the ceasefire, the town was still sporadically shelled and occasional gunfights had broken out. SDF troops completely withdrew from the city on the 20th of October, with an SDF Spokesperson saying that no SDF troops were left in the town. On the Sunday  86 vehicles left the town, taking SDF troops to Tal Tamer, about 40 kilometres south of Ras Al-Ain. A few hundred civilians also left the town with the SDF. Turkish and TFSA units captured the town later in the day.

Alleged chemical weapons attack
Allegations that illegal weapons had been used by TFSA forces were raised by medical teams treating civilians, who had been hit by Turkish allied forces weaponry in Ras Al-Ain on the 17th of October. A number of civilians, who had been evacuated to the nearby town of Hasakah to be treated at the Hospital, showed signs consistent with White Phosphorus burns. The civilians had the burn marks on both their faces and torso, and were first and second degree burns. Intentionally using white phosphorus against civilians, can be construed as a war crime. UN investigators collected evidence in order to investigate the claims. The Turkish Government denied it was a chemical attack, stating that they had no chemical weapons in their inventory. The situation was made worse for the wounded by the fact there were few medical centres left in Ras Al-Ain that could treat people. The Organisation for the Prohibition of Chemical Weapons (OPCW) made moves to investigate the attack, but eventually did not start an investigation, stating that White Phosphorus is a heat based weapon rather than chemical, and so outside its remit. There was some criticism of the OPCW, with allegation that it was biased based on the fact it received donations from Turkey.

See also
Battle of Ras al-Ayn (2012–13)

References 

2019 in Turkey
Kurdish–Turkish conflict (2015–present)
Ras al-Ayn
October 2019 events in Syria